The Cathedral Basilica of Saints Peter and Paul, head church of the Roman Catholic Archdiocese of Philadelphia, is located at 18th Street and the Benjamin Franklin Parkway, on the east side of Logan Square in Philadelphia. It was built between 1846 and 1864, and was designed by Napoleon LeBrun, from original plans by the Reverend Mariano Muller and the Reverend John B. Tornatore, with the dome and Palladian facade, designed by John Notman, added after 1850. The interior was largely decorated by Constantino Brumidi.

The cathedral is the largest Catholic church in Pennsylvania, and was listed on the U.S. National Register of Historic Places in 1971. The cathedral has been the site of two papal Masses, one celebrated by Pope John Paul II in 1979, and the other by Pope Francis in 2015. The current rector of the cathedral is the Reverend Gerald Dennis Gill and the current archbishop of Philadelphia is Nelson J. Perez.

History
On the Feast of Saints Peter and Paul, June 29, 1846, Bishop Kenrick, then Bishop of Philadelphia, issued a pastoral letter announcing his determination to build a cathedral.

Before Saint Peter and Paul was built, Philadelphia had two previous cathedrals; the first Catholic church in Philadelphia was Saint Joseph's, which was built in 1733. As the Catholic Church grew, a new church called Saint Mary's was built in 1763, which eventually was granted to be Philadelphia's first cathedral in 1810. As the Catholic Church continued to grow, Saint John the Evangelist was eventually made the new cathedral in 1838 when a larger church was needed, and Saint John's remained the cathedral until Bishop Kenrick began work on the Cathedral Basilica of Saints Peter and Paul.

It was the bishop's intention to avoid running into debt, so the cathedral was long in building. He chose for the site a plot of ground adjoining the seminary at Eighteenth and Race Streets. Construction on the cathedral began shortly after the bishop's pastoral letter in 1846 but was not completed until 1864. The construction began less than 2 years after the Philadelphia Nativist Riots of 1844, which represented the height of Anti-Catholicism and Know-Nothingism in Philadelphia and, according to local lore, greatly influenced the design of the building. The cathedral was built with only very high clerestory windows that according to parish histories would inhibit vandalism. In order to protect the windows of the Cathedral Basilica from possible future riots, the builders would throw stones into the air to determine the height of where the windows would be placed.

In 2017, the shrine of Saint Katharine Drexel was relocated to the cathedral after its former home, St. Elizabeth's Convent, was closed and sold off by the Sisters of the Blessed Sacrament.

Building

With its grand façade, vaulted dome, ornate main altar, eight side chapels and main sanctuary that comfortably holds 2,000 worshippers, the Cathedral Basilica of Saints Peter and Paul is the largest brownstone structure and one of the most architecturally notable structures in the city of Philadelphia.

The cathedral, presented in a Roman-Corinthian style of architecture, is modeled after the Lombard Church of St. Charles (San Carlo al Corso) in Rome. Its Palladian façade and aqua oxidized-copper dome are in the Italian Renaissance manner, as is the spacious interior, which features an oversized apse of stained glass and red antique marble in proportions reminiscent of Roman churches. A baldachin (canopy) over the main altar and the three altars on each of the side aisles point up this Italian Renaissance flavor. In the bowels of the building is the compact "Crypt of the Bishops".

Architects and designers
The basilica was designed by Napoleon LeBrun based on plans drawn up by the Reverend Mariano Muller and the Reverend John B. Tornatore, and by John Notman who added the dome and facade. LeBrun supervised the project from 1846 to 1851, when Notman took over until 1857, after which the cathedral was completed under LeBrun's supervision.

LeBrun was a native Philadelphian born to French-Catholic parents. He designed numerous churches throughout Philadelphia, including St. Patrick's Catholic Church, Twentieth Street (1841); the Seventh Presbyterian Church (1842); the Scot's Presbyterian Church (1843); the Catholic Church of St. Peter the Apostle (German), Fifth Street (1843); and the Protestant Episcopal Church of the Holy Nativity (1844), no longer standing. Other notable buildings he designed include the Philadelphia Academy of Music.

Notman is most noted for his Philadelphia ecclesiastical architecture for the Protestant Episcopal Church, including St. Mark's Church, Locust Street (1850); St. Clement's Church, Twentieth Street (1857); and the Church of the Holy Trinity, Rittenhouse Square.  He also designed the Athenaeum of Philadelphia and parts of the New Jersey State House.

Constantino Brumidi painted the ceiling mural in the dome—The Assumption of the Virgin into Heaven (1868)—and the round portraits of St. Matthew, St. Mark, St. Luke and St. John on its pendentives. Brumidi was a Greek/Italian-American painter, best known for his murals in the United States Capitol in Washington, D.C., especially The Apotheosis of Washington in the dome of the rotunda.

Architect Henry D. Dagit renovated the cathedral interior, 1914–1915, adding the apse behind the High Altar. D'Ascenzo Studios executed the apse's stained glass windows and mosaic murals.

The four bronze statues in niches on the building's main facade—Mary, Jesus, St. Peter and St. Paul—were added in 1915.

Ordinaries of Philadelphia

Under the main altar of the cathedral is a crypt with the remains of most of the bishops and archbishops, and of several other clergymen, of Philadelphia. The crypt can be reached by stairs behind the main altar. The crypt is the final resting place of:
Michael Francis Egan, O.S.F., first bishop of Philadelphia, consecrated October 28, 1810, died 1814.
Henry Conwell, second bishop of Philadelphia, consecrated 1820, died April 22, 1842.
James Frederick Wood, fifth bishop and first archbishop of Philadelphia, died June 20, 1882.
Patrick John Ryan, sixth bishop and second archbishop of Philadelphia, died February 3, 1911.
Edmond Prendergast, seventh bishop and third archbishop of Philadelphia, died February 26, 1918.
Dennis Joseph Dougherty, eighth bishop, fourth archbishop of Philadelphia, and first to be elevated to cardinal, died May 31, 1951.
John Krol, tenth bishop, sixth archbishop of Philadelphia, and third to be elevated to cardinal, died March 3, 1996.
Anthony Joseph Bevilacqua, eleventh bishop, seventh archbishop of Philadelphia, and fourth to be elevated to cardinal, died January 31, 2012.

Other entombments
 St. Katherine Drexel, Catholic Saint, Sisters of the Blessed Sacrament Founder, 1858–1955 (buried at St. Elizabeth's Convent and relocated to the cathedral in 2017)
 Francis Patrick O'Neill, pastor of St. James, Philadelphia, 1843–1882, died 1882.
 Maurice Walsh, pastor of St. Paul's Philadelphia, 1832–1888, died 1888.
 James Corcoran, professor at Saint Charles Seminary, died 1889.
 James J. Carroll, bishop, died 1913.
 Francis J. Clark, bishop, died 1918.
 Cletus Joseph Benjamin, bishop, died May 15, 1961.
 Gerald P. O'Hara, bishop, died July 16, 1963
 Francis Brennan, Prefect of the Sacred Congregation for the Discipline of the Sacraments, the first American to receive an appointment to the Roman Curia, died July 2, 1968.
 Gerald Vincent McDevitt, bishop, died September 29, 1980.
 John Patrick Foley, president of the Pontifical Council for Social Communications, seventh Philadelphia priest to be elevated to cardinal, died December 11, 2011.
 Martin Nicholas Lohmuller, auxiliary bishop of Philadelphia from 1970 to 1994, died January 24, 2017.

See also

 List of Catholic cathedrals in the United States
 List of cathedrals in the United States
 List of basilicas
 Roman Catholic Archdiocese of Philadelphia
 List of National Register of Historic Places entries
 :Category:Burials at the Cathedral Basilica of Saints Peter and Paul (Philadelphia)

References
Notes

External links

 Official Cathedral Site
 Roman Catholic Archdiocese of Philadelphia Official Site
 PBS: Holy Philadelphia
 USHistory.org
 Philadelphia Archdiocesan Historical Research Center
 Napoleon LeBrun architect's biography
 Catholic Encyclopedia
 WherePhiladelphia.com
 Panorama (drag mouse to look around, including ceiling and floor)

Basilica churches in Pennsylvania
Cemeteries on the National Register of Historic Places in Philadelphia
Roman Catholic churches in Philadelphia
Properties of religious function on the National Register of Historic Places in Philadelphia
Cathedral Basilica
Roman Catholic cathedrals in Pennsylvania
Logan Square, Philadelphia
Roman Catholic churches completed in 1864
Church buildings with domes
Churches on the National Register of Historic Places in Pennsylvania
Cathedrals in Philadelphia
19th-century Roman Catholic church buildings in the United States